The Spider's Lullabye is the sixth studio album by Danish heavy metal band King Diamond, released in 1995. Unlike other King Diamond albums, it is not a full concept album; only half the songs form a single plot. 

The album was recorded after a four-year hiatus and this is the first release to feature guitarist Herb Simonsen, bassist Chris Estes and drummer Darrin Anthony. It is also the band's first release on Metal Blade Records. Guitarist Andy LaRocque said it was the most difficult King Diamond album to record because "we had a new band [and] we had a totally new environment recording in the U.S., with a totally different producer." 

The album was remastered by LaRocque and re-released in 2009.

Summary
The first half of the songs on this album are listed as a variety of short stories before the second half form the plot.
"From the Other Side"
Tells about the protagonist's struggle with an out-of-body experience, forcing himself to come back to life before it is too late.
"Killer"
Describes a Richard Ramirez-type serial killer who is being put to death by electric chair.
"The Poltergeist"
Revolves around a ghost hunter who detects a spirit in their home. Fearing the invading ghost is evil, we are left unsure of the ghost's personality. The song ends with the ghost overcoming the hunter, who allows the ghost to "stay forever".
"Dreams"
Is about a man suffering a series of terrifying nightmares and encountering she-demons in the form of little girls who  take him to what appeared to be a paradise that existed on the opposite side of waterfalls in which they were swimming in. The sleepers finds out the little girls were not what they appeared to be and screams to escape the nightmare.
"Moonlight"
Tells about a group of cursed children, similar to the 1960 movie Village of the Damned.
"Six Feet Under"
The song tells the story of a person being buried alive in a glass coffin by their family; the story is similar to the ending of Conspiracy.
"The Spider's Lullabye"
Focuses on a reclusive man named Harry who is terrified of spiders and, out of desperation, finds a doctor who can cure his arachnophobia.
"Eastmann's Cure"
Is the continuing plot of Harry answering an ad in the local newspaper about a psychiatric hospital that specializes in curing phobias of all kinds. The second character in the song Dr. Eastmann introduces himself to Harry as a kind, friendly physician who hides his true intentions.
"Room 17"
In "Room 17", a confident Harry awaits Dr. Eastmann and his assistant Nurse Needle Dear to begin his treatment and cure. The so-called "treatment" was nothing more than a torture session when Nurse Needle unleashes a wolf spider from the "Crawly Box". The next day, Harry complains of having a weird feeling on his neck, spider bites and intense pain. Dr. Eastmann dismisses Harry's comments and thinks nothing more of it. The same night, when Harry is discovered by staff, they find him long dead and covered from head to toe in a spider web-like cocoon giving evidence that a series of spiders have wrapped him up like a fly, saving his dead body for consumption. Dr. Eastmann comes to the realization that Harry had clearly died of fright (possibly from the result of a heart attack), when Harry (who is now reduced to bones and skin) is taken.
"To the Morgue"
Along with other patients who have died for reasons unknown, spiders begin making their home in his empty eye sockets.

Track listing

Personnel
King Diamond - vocals, keyboards
Andy LaRocque - guitars, keyboards
Herb Simonsen - guitar
Chris Estes - bass
Darrin Anthony - drums

References

King Diamond albums
1995 albums